Colle di Tora is a  (municipality) in the Province of Rieti in the Italian region of Latium, located about  northeast of Rome and about  southeast of Rieti. It is located on the shores of Lake Turano.

Colle di Tora borders the following municipalities: Castel di Tora, Poggio Moiano, Pozzaglia Sabina, Rocca Sinibalda.

References

Cities and towns in Lazio